Mostafa Ekrami (born June 21, 1983) is an Iranian footballer. He currently plays for Gostaresh.

Club career
He is a native of Sarab, East Azerbaijan, unless being born in Tehran. Ekrami joined Tractor Sazi from Esteghlal Ahvaz in summer 2008. He played five seasons for the club.

Club career statistics

 Assist Goals

Honours
Tractor Sazi
Iran Pro League Runner-up: 2011–12, 2012–13

References

1983 births
Living people
Tractor S.C. players
Esteghlal Ahvaz players
Payam Mashhad players
Sportspeople from Tehran
Esteghlal F.C. players
Shirin Faraz Kermanshah players
Sanat Mes Kerman F.C. players
Gostaresh Foulad F.C. players
Persian Gulf Pro League players
Azadegan League players
Association football defenders
Association football players not categorized by nationality